= College Book Renter =

US textbook company

College Book Renter was a textbook company founded in 2009 that allows students to rent, buy and sell their college textbooks online.

== History ==
South Eastern Book Co (SEB), based in Murray, Kentucky, announced on July 6, 2010, that it took an ownership interest in College Book Renter (CBR) called Series A. The $10 million Series A investment was in the form of equity funding from SEB. In addition, College Book Renter secured $7.5 million in debt financing in 2010. With this $17.5 million, the two companies planned to work together.

College Book Renter and South Eastern Book are managed by C. A. Jones Management Group, LLC, which provides an umbrella for the diverse business holdings of Charles A. (Chuck) Jones, of Murray, Kentucky.

In 2013, the company went bankrupt and subsequently sold to David Griffin. The company was then moved to Nashville, Tennessee.
